Route 106 is a highway in the southern part of the US State of Missouri.  Its eastern terminus is at Route 21 at Ellington; its western terminus is at Route 17 in Summersville.  Route 106 runs through the eastern, mountainous Ozarks and through two sections of the Ozark National Scenic Riverways.

Major intersections

Related route

Spur Route 106 connects the main highway with Deer Run State Forest.

References

106
Transportation in Texas County, Missouri
Transportation in Shannon County, Missouri
Transportation in Reynolds County, Missouri